Treaty of Vilna, Vilnius, Wilna or Wilno may refer to
Union of Vilnius and Radom (1401)
Union of Kraków and Vilna (1499)
Treaty of Vilna (1559), during the Livonian War
Treaty of Vilna (1561), during the Livonian War
Truce of Vilna (1656), during the Russo-Polish War (1654–1667) and the Second Northern War (1655–1660)